Nadine Hwang, or Nadine Huong (Chinese 黃訥亭); (March 3, 1902 – 1972) was one of the first Chinese female pilots and served in the Chinese Air Force as an honorary colonel. The lawyer used diplomatic skills and her versatile abilities to live in different countries. She was mistress of Natalie Clifford Barney and survived deportation to Ravensbrück concentration camp.

Early life 

Nadine Hwang was born in Madrid, to a Belgian mother, Juliette Brouta-Gilliard, and a Chinese father, Lühe Hwang. Both her parents were Catholics. Nadine was baptized in June of 1902 in Madrid, in the parish church of Nuestra Señora del Pilar. Her father, who came from an influential Chinese family, was a diplomat and high official. Fluent in Spanish, he was transferred to Madrid at the beginning of his career as secretary of the 1st legation, where he met his future wife Juliette Brouta-Gilliard. In 1904 he was briefly transferred to Havana, where in 1905 Hwang's sister Marcela was born, later the writer and translator Marcela de Juan (died 1981). A few months later, the whole family returned to Madrid, where Lühe had been appointed head of the Chinese legation.

At school in Madrid, Nadine Hwang spoke Castilian fluently as well as her native French. She practiced Mandarin Chinese with the other families in the legation and took English lessons.

Emancipation 
After the collapse of Manchu rule in 1911 and the establishment of the Republic, which had been proclaimed on January 1, 1912, Hwang's father was transferred to Beijing in 1913 to the European Affairs Department of the Ministry of Foreign Affairs. The family moved to China, where they moved among the political, intellectual and social elite. Nadine Hwang continued her education in an international school run by French nuns. She then studied law at the American Hamilton College via distance learning.

As a young girl from a family of high social status, Hwang had the privilege of meeting personalities of her time such as Mao Zedong, Lin Yutang, and Hu Shi, who were invited to the family home as guests.

Even as a girl, Nadine Hwang tried to escape the bonds of convention and gender roles. She learned to drive a car and fly small planes at a very early age. "Everything fascinates me about these Western mechanics," she confided to an Excelsior journalist in 1928. "I would love to sit on a locomotive and drive a train at full steam". She liked to wear men's clothes, whether for sports or for a party, where, for example, she would appear in traditional Aragonese costume to dance the Aragonese Jota with a female rider. Japanese-American artist and designer Isamu Noguchi recalled meeting a "beautiful lieutenant in the army of the young Marshal Chang Hsueh-Liang" in 1930. He described her as "piratical." She learned sports such as polo, cricket, and riding. Unthinkable to the average Chinese women of her time. Not long ago, Chinese women had been freed from the thousand-year-old tradition of foot binding.

Career in China 
Zhang Zongchang was the first warlord to accept women into his army. When he met Nadine Hwang, he decided to make her a colonel in the Air Force and insisted that she wear short hair and a uniform. Although her rank as colonel was apparently only an honorary rank, Nadine was nevertheless given a position of trust as a staff liaison officer. It was during this time that she earned her nickname, "the Amazon of the North."

Nadine Hwang was stationed as a lieutenant in the Chinese army under Marshal Chang Hsueh-Liang from 1929. She later obtained an important economic position in the Chinese Beiyang government and worked as a confidential secretary to Prime Minister Pan Fu. She had previously worked for him as a press officer since 1927.

Her amazing career brings her to the position of advisor to Prime Minister Pan-Fu at the age of twenty-five. Her appointment to this post struck the old regime like a thunderbolt in July. Known as the 'Amazon of the North', Miss Hwang holds the rank of colonel in both the Chinese infantry and the Chinese Air Corps, whose smart uniform she wears with a thoroughly non-feminine, elegant brashness. Miss Hwang is by far the most versatile and unusual young woman in northern China. She changes her personality with her costume and appears in the twelve hours of the day as a tomboy par excellence, a dashing officer, a politician, a young society girl and an accomplished world lady. In the morning she is seen riding, fencing or playing tennis in a correct man's suit, until she goes to her office punctually at 8 o'clock, at the flounce of her own car, with a chauffeur-soldier behind her.The modernization of Republican China under Nationalist rule in the early 1930s was threatened by domestic unrest and an increasingly aggressive Imperial Japan, so Hwang could never live the life she wanted in China. In 1933, she moved to Paris, where she indulged in the bohemian life. Traveling to the USA and through Europe, she lectured about her country and diplomatically advocated for greater economic exchange.

Paris 

At the beginning of the 1930s, Nadine Hwang moved to Paris, occasionally took on the role of chauffeur for Natalie Clifford Barney and became her lover. Barney regularly hosted literary salons (Le salon de l'Amazone), where cosmopolitan, avant-garde Paris mostly met in her Temple of Friendship (French: Le Temple de l'Amitié). Hwang enjoyed the bohemian lifestyle that the Parisian capital offered her. In one account of this particular period of Parisian history, she is described as a "piratical" Asian beauty, while in another account she is described as a transvestite.

Barney's salon gathered a large group of intellectuals and artists from all over the world, including many leading figures of French literature as well as American and British modernists, the so-called Lost Generation of the early 20th century. There is evidence to suggest that Nadine Hwang also spied against the Nazis as an agent on behalf of the French Resistance. According to a description in the writings of Helene Nera, Hwang suffered from suffocating racism due to her Chinese identity and jealousies among Barney's many lovers and admirers.

In 1940, all of Europe was overshadowed by the Nazi influence, Natalie Barney fled the German invasion to Florence. Nadine Hwang was deported to the Ravensbrück women's concentration camp in 1944 for reasons as yet unknown, shortly before the liberation of large parts of France by the Allies.

Deportation 
On May 13, 1944, the transport left the Gare de l'Est in Paris. Four days later, the 567 women arrived at Fürstenberg train station. In the Ravensbrück concentration camp, Nadine Hwang was given prisoner number 39239 and had to wear the red triangle, which marked her as a political prisoner.

She had to do forced labor at Siemens and became friends with Rachel Krausz and her nine-year-old daughter Irene Krausz, both British citizens who had lived in the Netherlands. „My mother and Nadine shared a love of poetry“,reported Irene Fainman-Krausz, who lives in South Africa as of 2018. To remember Nadine Hwang - after all, she helped her and her mother survive - Irene gave her daughter, who was born in 1971 - just one year after Hwang's death - the first name Nadine.

Nelly Mousset-Vos 
On Christmas Eve 1944, Nelly Mousset-Vos was asked to sing Christmas carols in the barracks with French prisoners. After a few songs, a voice called out, "Sing something from Madame Butterfly!" Mousset-Vos sang Un bel dì vedremo, about waiting for a loved one. Nadine Hwang, who had asked for the song, stayed connected to Mousset-Vos from that moment on. They became a couple and spent as much time together as possible. Nelly Mousset-Vos's diary entries reveal that it was thanks to her meeting with Nadine Hwang and through this love affair that she was able to survive the horrors of concentration camps. Nelly Mousset-Vos had worked as a courier in the Belgian resistance against the Nazis.

They were separated in March 1945, when Nelly Mousset-Vos was deported to the Mauthausen concentration camp, where she almost died. In April 1945, shortly before the liberation of the camp, Nadine Hwang, Irene and Rachel, along with thousands of other prisoners, were evacuated to Sweden on Red Cross white buses. Their arrival in Malmö on April 28 was documented by Swedish news photographers.

After the war 

In 1945, Nadine Hwang moved to Brussels via Sweden and began living together with Nelly Mousset-Vos in a lesbian relationship. They left Europe soon after to start a new life in Venezuela. They posed as cousins and lived together in Caracas for two decades. Nelly Mousset-Vos had previously worked at the Venezuelan embassy in Brussels and Hwang worked in the secretariat of a bank in Caracas. Their apartment was a popular meeting place for friends and acquaintances. Due to an illness, Hwang was forced to take strong medication and she suffered a stroke before the treatment was completed. Due to Nadine Hwang's deteriorating health, the couple returned to Europe in the late 1960s.

Nadine Hwang died in 1972, Nelly Mousset-Vos in 1985, and they are buried in different graves in Brussels.

Weblinks 

 Nadine Hwang – Every Face Has a Name

Literature 
 Alfonso Ojedas: Cinco historias de la conexión española con la India, Birmania y China: Desde la imprenta a la igualdad de género. Los Libros de La Catarata 2020, ISBN 978-8-41352-044-5.

Films 
Magnus Gertten realized a trilogy of documentaries between 2011 and 2022, which also deals with the life of Nadine Hwang:
 Harbour of Hope (Originaltitel: Hoppets hamn, 2011)
 Every Face Has a Name (2015)
 Nelly &amp; Nadine (2022)

References 

1972 deaths
1902 births
Chinese people
LGBT rights activists
Ravensbrück concentration camp prisoners
Holocaust survivors
World War II resistance members by nationality
Chinese Roman Catholics
Chinese aviators
Aviation pioneers
Chinese colonels
Air force officers
Women aviation pioneers
Women aviators
Chinese women aviators
Chinese emigrants to Belgium
Belgian people of Chinese descent